Flan is the third studio album by the avant-garde artist Dogbowl. It was released in 1992 on Shimmy Disc.

Track listing

Personnel 
Adapted from Flan liner notes.

 Dogbowl – lead vocals, guitar, illustrations
Musicians
 Race Age – drums, percussion
 Michael J. Schumacher – guitar, piano, synthesizer
 Lee Ming Tah – bass guitar, steel guitar
 Christopher Tunney – clarinet, saxophone, tin whistle, organ, backing vocals

Production and additional personnel
 Kramer – production, engineering
 Michael Macioce – photography
 Ron Paul – assistant engineer

Release history

References

External links 
 

1992 albums
Albums produced by Kramer (musician)
Dogbowl albums
Shimmy Disc albums